Łukasz Nawotczyński (born March 30, 1982 in Ciechanów) is a Polish footballer playing as defender.

Successes 

Zawisza Bydgoszcz

 1x Polish Cup: 2013/14

Wisła Kraków
 2x Polish Champion: 2000/01, 2003/04
 2x Polish Cup: 2001/02, 2002/03
 1x Ekstraklasa Cup: 2000/01

Career

Club
He used to play for Wisła Kraków, Lechia Gdańsk, Górnik Polkowice, GKS Katowice, Jagiellonia Białystok and Korona Kielce.

International
Łukasz Nawotczyński was also a member of U-17 Poland national football team which participated in 1999 FIFA U-17 World Championship.

External links
 

1982 births
Living people
People from Ciechanów
Polish footballers
Lechia Gdańsk players
Wisła Kraków players
Arka Gdynia players
Górnik Polkowice players
GKS Katowice players
Jagiellonia Białystok players
Korona Kielce players
MKS Cracovia (football) players
Zawisza Bydgoszcz players
Sportspeople from Masovian Voivodeship
Association football defenders